By Hook or by Crook is a 1980 Hong Kong kung fu film produced and directed by Karl Maka and starring Sammo Hung and Dean Shek.

Plot
The film starts out with a thief stealing jewelry from a millionaire Chin Pai-wen (Tang Ching). The family believes it was done by the infamous Flower Kid, who steals from the rich and gives it to the poor. They then hire Sheriff Butcher Wing (Karl Maka) to find him. However, Chin's wife (Yau Poon-ling) suggests Skinny Gee (Dean Shek), a con man who catches crooks, instead. So Butcher Wing tries to get Skinny Gee by framing him for harassing his sister and offers him a deal if he finds the Flower Kid. Gee manages to Flower Kid. Gee then tells Wing a plan to arrest Flower Kid by setting him up. They fail and Wing arrests Gee for fooling him. Flower Kid then arrives, disguised as a woman, to rescue Gee out of jail. It was a set up by Flower Kid and Gee. Later it is revealed that he is not the real Flower Kid. He is a man named Fatso (Sammo Hung), who idolizes Flower Kid and pretends to be him.

Fatso and Gee later finds the real Flower Kid (Wu Ma), who is now old and retired. Then it was also revealed who the thief was at the beginning of the film, a lover of Lady Chin. Later, Lady Chin hires an assassin, Chung Fat-pak (Chung Fat), to kill Flower Kid. The assassin also kills Lady Chin's lover.

Fatso and Gee tries to get a bodyguard for Flower Kid. The bodyguard is a knife throwing expert. He engages in a Mexican standoff against Never Miss (Eric Tsang) a gun expert. Never Miss kills the bodyguard. Then, Fatso and Gee start training Flower Kid to get his confidence and energy back. During this time, Chung kills Chin Pai-wen. Later, Fatso and Gee also hired a family to act as victim of Chung to get Flower Kid's confidence to battle Chung.

The trio then proceeds to find Chung where they engage in a big fight at Chin's funeral. First, Fatso and Gee battles Chung's two henchmen and Flower Kid fights Chung. Then, Fatso and Gee kill the henchmen and then Fatso fights Chung eventually killing him in the end. Afterwards, Flower Kid leaves town. In the end, Gee is arrested again, Fatso is arrested too, but he was rewarded out to be sheriff and instead, Wing takes his spot in jail.

Cast
 Sammo Hung as Fatso
 Dean Shek as Skinny Gee
 Eric Tsang as Never Miss
 Wu Ma as Flower Kid
 Karl Maka as Sheriff Butcher Wing
 Alice Lau as Butcher Wing's sister
 Chung Fat as Chung Fat-pak the Golden Killer
 Tang Ching as Millionaire Chin Pai-wen
 Tai San as Flower Kid impersonator
 Chow Kam-kong as Ta-[ao
 Ho Pak-kwong as Skinny Gee's father in law
 Lam Ching-ying as Gang leader
 Ban Yun-sang as thug
 Siu Tak-foo as Golden Killer's man
 Yau Pooi-ling as Lady Chin
 Hon Kwok-choi as Gang leader
 Johnny Cheung as Gangster
 Pang Yun-cheung
 Sai Gwa-Pau
 Shing Wan-on
 Ha Kwok-wing
 Gigi Wong
 Ng Min-kan

See also

Sammo Hung filmography

References

External links
 IMDb entry
 
 

1980 films
1980s action comedy films
1980 martial arts films
Hong Kong action comedy films
Hong Kong martial arts films
Kung fu films
Hong Kong martial arts comedy films
Hong Kong slapstick comedy films
1980s Cantonese-language films
1980s Hong Kong films